A coccidiostat is an antiprotozoal agent that acts upon Coccidia parasites.

Examples include:
 Amprolium
 Arprinocid
 Artemether
 Clazuril
 Clopidol
 Decoquinate
 Diclazuril
 Dinitolmide
 Ethopabate
 Halofuginone
 Lasalocid
 Monensin
 Narasin
 Nicarbazin
 Oryzalin
 Ponazuril
 Robenidine
 Roxarsone
 Salinomycin
 Spiramycin
 Sulfadiazine
 Sulfadimethoxine
 Toltrazuril

References

Antiprotozoal agents